The Delhi–Barmer Link Express is an Express train belonging to Northern Railway zone that runs between  and  in India. It is currently being operated with 14661/14662 train numbers on a daily basis.

Service

The 14661/Delhi–Barmer Link Express has an average speed of 51 km/hr and covers 828 km in 16h 10m. The 14662/Barmer–Delhi Link Express has an average speed of 48 km/hr and covers 828 km in 17h 15m.

Route and halts 

The important halts of the train are:

 Old

Coach composition

The train has standard ICF rakes with max speed of 110 kmph. The train consists of 18 coaches:

 1 First AC and Second AC
 1 AC II Tier
 1 AC III Tier
 8 Sleeper coaches
 5 General
 2 Seating cum Luggage Rake

Traction

Both trains are hauled by an Abu Road Loco Shed-based WDM-3A diesel locomotive from Old Delhi to Jodhpur. From Jodhpur, trains are hauled by an Abu Road Loco Shed-based WDM-3A diesel locomotive uptil Barmer, and vice versa.

Rake sharing

The train shares its rake with 14646/14645 Shalimar Express and 14659/14660 Malani Express.

See also 

 Old Delhi railway station
 Barmer railway station
 Malani Express

Notes

References

External links 

 Delhi–Barmer Link Express
 Barmer–Delhi Link Express

Transport in Barmer, Rajasthan
Transport in Delhi
Express trains in India
Rail transport in Delhi
Rail transport in Haryana
Rail transport in Rajasthan